David Blaney (born 3 March 1979, Ireland) is a rugby union player who played for Bristol Rugby in the Guinness Premiership. He plays as a hooker. He left Bristol at the end of the 2010–11 season.

Educated in Terenure College, Dublin, he was the winning captain of the 1997 Leinster Schools Rugby Senior Cup.

References

External links 
 Guinness Premiership profile
 Bristol profile
 Statbunker profile

Living people
1979 births
Irish rugby union players
Bristol Bears players
Rugby union players from Dublin (city)
Rugby union hookers
Leinster Rugby players
Irish expatriate rugby union players
Irish expatriate sportspeople in England
Expatriate rugby union players in England